Sarikondapalem is a village in Palnadu district of the Indian state of Andhra Pradesh. It is the headquarters of Bollapalle mandal in Narasaraopet revenue division.

Geography 

Sarikondapalem is situated to the south of the mandal headquarters, Bhattiprolu,

Governance 

Sarikondapalem gram panchayat is the local self-government of the village. It is divided into wards and each ward is represented by a ward member.

Education 

As per the school information report for the academic year 2018–19, the village has a total of 3 MPP schools.

References 

Villages in Palnadu district